Attāb ibn Asid was a member of the Banu Umayya clan of the Quraysh tribe. He was appointed as the governor of the city of Mecca, in the wake of its conquest, by the Islamic prophet Muhammad in the January of 630, at a young age. 

Attab had converted to Islam after Mecca was conquered by the Muslims. Due to its sanctity for the Muslims, the governorship of Mecca was a coveted post and Attab was appointed over several other more experienced potential candidates from the Quraysh, which dominated the city. He continued in the post through the caliphate of Abu Bakr until 634, according to 8th/9th-century historian Al-Waqidi, or until 642 during the rule of Caliph Umar, according to the 9th-century historian Al-Tabari. Attab was married to Juwayriya, a daughter of Abu Jahl, one of the early principal leaders of Qurayshite opposition to Muhammad. According to al-Waqidi, Attab died in 634, while al-Tabari held that he died in 644. His son Abd al-Rahman was a prominent soldier in Aisha’s army who was slain by Malik al-Ashtar in the Battle of the Camel in 656.

See also
Abdallah ibn Khalid ibn Asid, nephew

References

Bibliography

612 births
644 deaths
7th-century Arabs
Banu Umayya
Rashidun governors of Mecca